Clanculus dunkeri, common name Dunker's clanculus, is a species of sea snail, a marine gastropod mollusk in the family Trochidae, the top snails.

Description
The height of the shell attains 9 mm, its diameter varies between 11 mm and 13 mm. The thick, solid, imperforate shell has a little hollow or depression at the place of the umbilicus. It is orbicularly conoid or subdepressed with 5 whorls. The first whorl is whitish, often eroded, the last brownish, purplish or red, obliquely striated, and ornamented with spiral granulose lirae, 3 on the penultimate whorl, 8 or 9 on the body whorl, of which the first is composed of larger beads, and the fourth forms the periphery. The interstices are about as wide as the lirae. The body whorl is somewhat gibbous and descends toward the aperture, which in adult specimens is somewhat contracted and subtrigonal. The outer lip shows a few deeply entering lirae within, the upper one terminating in a small denticle. The short columella is concave and smooth. It terminates in an acute narrow denticle, which is separated from a similar smaller tubercle on the base by a narrow notch.

Distribution
This marine species is endemic to Australia and occurs in the subtidal zone off South Australia, Tasmania, Victoria and Western Australia.

References

 Philippi, R.A. 1843. Abbildungen und Beschriebungen neuer oder wenig gekannter Conchylien. Cassel : T. Fischer Vol. 1 pp. 21–76.
 Philippi, R.A. 1852. Trochidae. pp. 233–248 in Küster, H.C. (ed). Systematisches Conchylien-Cabinet von Martini und Chemnitz. Nürnberg : Bauer & Raspe Vol. 2
 Adams, A. 1853. Contributions towards a monograph of the Trochidae, a family of gastropodous Mollusca. Proceedings of the Zoological Society of London 1851(19): 150-192
 Adams, H. & Adams, A. 1853. The genera of Recent Mollusca arranged according to their organization. London : John Van Voorst Vol. 1 pp. 1–256.
 Angas, G.F. 1865. On the marine molluscan fauna of the Province of South Australia, with a list of all the species known up to the present time, together with remarks on their habitats and distribution, etc. Proceedings of the Zoological Society of London 1865: 155-"180" (=190) 
 Fischer, P. 1878. Genres Calcar, Trochus, Xenophora, Tectarius et Risella. pp. 241–336 in Keiner, L.C. (ed.). Spécies general et iconographie des coquilles vivantes. Paris : J.B. Baillière Vol. 11.
 Tenison-Woods, J.E. 1879. On some new Tasmanian marine shells. Proceedings of the Royal Society of Tasmania 1878: 32-40 
 Brazier, J. 1886. Trochidae and other genera of Mollusca from Tasmania, with their synonyms. Part 1. Proceedings of the Royal Society of Tasmania 1886: 193-207 
 Watson, R.B. 1886. Report on the Scaphopoda and Gastropoda collected by the H.M.S. "Challenger" during the years 1873-1876. Report on the Scientific Results of the Voyage of H.M.S. Challenger 1873–1876, Zoology 15(42): 756 pp., 50 pls
 Brazier, J. 1887. Trochidae and other genera of South Australia, with their synonyms. Transactions of the Royal Society of South Australia 9: 116-125 
 Tate, R. & May, W.L. 1901. A revised census of the marine Mollusca of Tasmania. Proceedings of the Linnean Society of New South Wales 26(3): 344-471 
 Pritchard, G.B. & Gatliff, J.H. 1902. Catalogue of the marine shells of Victoria. Part V. Proceedings of the Royal Society of Victoria 14(2): 85-138
 Hedley, C. 1916. A preliminary index of the Mollusca of Western Australia. Journal and Proceedings of the Royal Society of Western Australia 1: 152-226
 Chapman, F. 1920. Notes on a collection of Tertiary Fossils from Ooldea and Watson, South Australia. Proceedings of the Royal Society of Victoria 32(2): 225–245, pls 16-17
 May, W.L. 1921. A Checklist of the Mollusca of Tasmania. Hobart, Tasmania : Government Printer 114 pp.
 May, W.L. 1923. An Illustrated Index of Tasmanian Shells. Hobart : Government Printer 100 pp.
 Thiele, J. 1930. Gastropoda und Bivalvia. pp. 561–596 in Michaelsen, W. & Hartmayer, R. (eds). Die Fauna Südwest-Australiens. Jena : Gustav Fischer Vol. 5
 Cotton, B.C. & Godfrey, F.K. 1934. South Australian Shells. Part 11. South Australian Naturalist 15(3): 77-92
 Cotton, B.C. 1938. The Joseph Banks Islands No 4. Mollusca. Part 2. Reports of the McCoy Society for Field Investigation and Research. Proceedings of the Royal Society of Victoria ns 51(1): 159-176 
 Cotton, B.C. 1959. South Australian Mollusca. Archaeogastropoda. Handbook of the Flora and Fauna of South Australia. Adelaide : South Australian Government Printer 449 pp.
 Macpherson, J.H. & Gabriel, C.J. 1962. Marine Molluscs of Victoria. Melbourne : Melbourne University Press & National Museum of Victoria 475 pp.
 Ludbrook, N.H. 1978. Quaternary molluscs of the western part of the Eucla Basin. Bulletin of the Geological Survey of Western Australia 125: 1-286
 Wilson B. (1993) Australian marine shells. Prosobranch gastropods. Vol. 1. Odyssey Publishing, Kallaroo, Western Australia, 408 pp.
 Jansen, P. 1995. A review of the genus Clanculus Montfort, 1810 (Gastropoda: Trochidae) in Australia, with description of a new subspecies and the introduction of a nomen novum. Vita Marina 43(1-2): 39-62

External links

External links
 To Biodiversity Heritage Library (3 publications)
 To World Register of Marine Species

dunkeri
Gastropods of Australia
Gastropods described in 1843